National Pedestrian Day (Indonesian: Hari Pejalan Kaki) is celebrated annually on January 22 in Indonesia.  In particular, the capital suffers from lack of sidewalks and uneven walking surfaces.

References

Festivals in Indonesia
Walking
Pedestrian activism